Salem Airport  is a city-owned, public-use airport located one nautical mile (2 km) south of the central business district of Salem, a city in Fulton County, Arkansas, United States.

Facilities and aircraft 
Salem Airport covers an area of 127 acres (51 ha) at an elevation of 787 feet (240 m) above mean sea level. It has one runway designated 2/20 with an asphalt surface measuring 3,489 by 50 feet (1,063 x 15 m).

For the 12-month period ending May 31, 2010, the airport had 4,150 aircraft operations, an average of 11 per day: 96% general aviation and 4% military. At that time there were 10 single-engine aircraft based at this airport.

References

External links 
 Salem Airport (7M9) at the Arkansas Department of Aeronautics
 Aerial image as of February 2001 from USGS The National Map
 

Airports in Arkansas
Transportation in Fulton County, Arkansas